The Human Jungle may refer to:

 The Human Jungle (film), 1954 US film directed by Joseph M. Newman
 The Human Jungle (TV series), 1960s British TV series